The Port of İzmir, alternatively known as Port of Alsancak, is a seaport in İzmir, Turkey. It is situated in the Gulf of İzmir.

History
İzmir was an important port of the Ottoman Empire and the first quay was constructed in 1869. The port was constructed between 1955 and 1959. Its first operator was Turkish State Railways. In 1960 it was acquired by DenizBank (a state-owned bank responsible for maritime business). On 1 January 1989 it was handed back to Turkish State Railways. In 2007 it was privatized. But because of legal reasons the privatization was halted. In March 2017, it became a sister port of the Port of Miami. In 2018 the port infrastructure was included in the Turkey Wealth Fund.

Technical details
With this length the quay serves for 18 ships.

Business
According to 2018 figures, the number of marine vessels which visit the port is 2,047. The total trading size in the same year was 9 million tonnes.

References

Buildings and structures in İzmir
Konak District
Container terminals
Turkish State Railways
Gulf of İzmir
İzmir
İzmir
1959 establishments in Turkey